David Perkins may refer to:
David Perkins (footballer) (born 1982), English footballer
David Perkins (geneticist) (1919–2007), American geneticist
David G. Perkins (born 1957), United States Army general